Seven Ways is the second studio album by Paul van Dyk, released on MFS in 1996 and later on Deviant Records and Mute Records. Several editions include a bonus disc featuring remixes of tracks from the main disc, as well as bonus tracks.

The album was voted #1 by the readers of DJ Magazine.

Track listing

References

External links 

1996 albums
Paul van Dyk albums
Deviant Records albums
Mute Records albums